Brazil competed at the 2015 World Aquatics Championships in Kazan, Russia from 24 July to 9 August 2015.

Medalists

Diving

Men

Women

Mixed

High diving

Open water swimming

Brazil has fielded a team of eight swimmers to compete in the open water marathon.

Men

Women

Mixed

Swimming

Brazilian swimmers have achieved qualifying standards in the following events (up to a maximum of 2 swimmers in each event at the A-standard entry time, and 1 at the B-standard): Swimmers must qualify at the 2015 Maria Lenk Trophy (for pool events) to confirm their places for the Worlds.

Men

Women

Mixed

Synchronized swimming

Brazil fielded a full squad of eleven synchronized swimmers to compete in each of the following events at the World Championships.

Water polo

Men's tournament

Team roster

Vinicius Antonelli
Jonas Crivella
Guilherme Gomes
Ives González
Paulo Salemi
Bernardo Gomes
Adrià Delgado
Felipe Costa e Silva
Bernardo Rocha
Felipe Perrone
Gustavo Guimarães
Josip Vrlić
Thyê Bezerra

Group play

Playoffs

9th–12th place semifinals

Ninth place game

Women's tournament

Team roster

Tess Oliveira
Diana Abla
Marina Zablith
Mariana Duarte
Lucianne Barroncas
Izabella Chiappini
Amanda Oliveira
Luiza Carvalho
Melani Dias
Viviane Bahia
Lorena Borges
Gabriela Mantellato
Victória Chamorro

Group play

Playoffs

9th–12th place semifinals

Ninth place game

References

External links
Official website

Nations at the 2015 World Aquatics Championships
2015
World Aquatics Championships